First Citizens Plaza is a  office high-rise in Charlotte, North Carolina. It was completed in 1985 and has 23 floors.

See also
 List of tallest buildings in Charlotte

References

Office buildings in Charlotte, North Carolina
Office buildings completed in 1985